Million Dollar Matchmaker is an American reality television show, first broadcast on July 8, 2016 on WE TV. The AMC Networks series franchise is fronted by Patti Stanger, who serves financially wealthy clients in their quest for love.

The series opener was officially slated for production during September 2015, shadowing the Bravo broadcast of the same premise The Millionaire Matchmaker popularly hosted by Patti Stanger.  The ten-episode season proved to gather ratings worthy of a continuing installment.

On April 5, 2017 it was announced that AMC Networks had ordered a second season of Million Dollar Matchmaker making its debut on WE TV on August 4, 2017. In season two, Stanger returns with a set of fellow relationship experts joining her matchmaking team : Candace Smith and Maxwell Billieon. The Million Dollar Matchmaking trio join forces for one mission: to help client of celebrity status and financial wealth find love.

Episodes

Season 1 (2016)

Season 2 (2017)

References

External links

2010s American reality television series
2016 American television series debuts
English-language television shows
American dating and relationship reality television series
2017 American television series endings